Riverside South can refer to:

Places
 Riverside South, Ottawa, a suburban neighbourhood
 Riverside South (New York City), an apartment complex also known as Trump Place
 Riverside South (Canary Wharf), an office development in London, England

See also
 South Riverside, an early name of Corona, California